The 2018 Federated Auto Parts 400 was a Monster Energy NASCAR Cup Series race that was held on September 22, 2018, at Richmond Raceway in Richmond, Virginia. Contested over 400 laps on the  D-shaped short track, it was the 28th race of the 2018 Monster Energy NASCAR Cup Series season, second race of the Playoffs and second race of the Round of 16.

Report

Background

Richmond Raceway (RR), formerly known as Richmond International Raceway (RIR), is a 3/4-mile (1.2 km), D-shaped, asphalt race track located just outside Richmond, Virginia in Henrico County. It hosts the Monster Energy NASCAR Cup Series and NASCAR Xfinity Series. Known as "America's premier short track", it formerly hosted a NASCAR Camping World Truck Series race, an IndyCar Series race and two USAC sprint car races.

Entry list

Practice

First practice

Final practice

Qualifying

Qualifying results

Kyle Busch, Daniel Suárez, Regan Smith, and David Ragan all started from the rear after failing inspection.

Race

Stage Results

Stage 1
Laps: 100

Stage 2
Laps: 100

Final Stage Results

Stage 3
Laps: 200

Race statistics
 Lead changes: 8 among different drivers
 Cautions/Laps: 3 for 23
 Red flags: 0
 Time of race: 2 hours, 54 minutes and 30 seconds
 Average speed:

Media

Television
NBC Sports covered the race on the television side. Rick Allen, Jeff Burton, Steve Letarte and three-time Richmond winner Dale Earnhardt Jr. had the call in the booth for the race. Dave Burns, Marty Snider and Kelli Stavast will report from pit lane during the race.

Radio
The Motor Racing Network had the radio call for the race, which was simulcast on Sirius XM NASCAR Radio.

Standings after the race

Manufacturers' Championship standings

Note: Only the first 16 positions are included for the driver standings.

References

Federated Auto Parts 400
Federated Auto Parts 400
NASCAR races at Richmond Raceway
Federated Auto Parts 400